Godlee is a surname. Notable people with the surname include:

 Rickman Godlee (1849–1925), English surgeon
 Fiona Godlee (born 1961), British journal editor

See also
 Godlee Observatory